Mika Kruse (born June 27, 1998) is an American rugby union player, currently playing for the Utah Warriors of Major League Rugby (MLR) and the United States national team. His preferred position is centre or wing.

Professional career
Kruse signed for Major League Rugby side Utah Warriors for the 2021 Major League Rugby season, having played for Colorado Raptors from 2018 to 2020, having also signed but not played for the LA Giltinis. 

Kruse debuted for United States against England during the 2021 July rugby union tests.

References

External links
itsrugby.co.uk Profile

1998 births
Living people
United States international rugby union players
Rugby union centres
Rugby union wings
Sportspeople from Fresno, California
American rugby union players
American Raptors players
Utah Warriors players